Morgny-la-Pommeraye is a commune in the Seine-Maritime department in the Normandy region in north-western France.

Geography
Morgny station has rail connections to Rouen, Lille and Amiens.

Heraldry

Population

Places of interest
 The church of Notre-Dame, dating from the seventeenth century.
 The church of St.Madeleine, dating from the seventeenth century.
 The Château de Mondétour.
 A sixteenth century manorhouse.

See also
Communes of the Seine-Maritime department

References

Communes of Seine-Maritime